Carlos António Dinis (born April 4, 1966 in Luanda) is an Angolan basketball head coach. He is a brother of Angolan former football player Joaquim Dinis.

Career 

Dinis is the head coach of Angolan side Atlético Sport Aviação (ASA), while also being the head coach of Angola's U18 basketball team.

In February 2016, he was appointed head coach of the Angolan senior basketball team, ahead of the qualification tournament for the 2016 Olympic games.

External links
 Profile at FIBA.com
 PlanetaBasket Interview

References

Angolan basketball coaches
1966 births
Living people
Sportspeople from Luanda